Vilappuram Bhagavathy Temple is a small place, home of the famous Vilappuram Devi Temple (Anandavilasam Bhagavathi Temple) situated in Chathannoor, Kollam, Kerala. In the same compound there is the famous Anandavilasam library, affiliated to Kerala State Library Council having more than 1200 members and around 13000 books. In the library there is the facilities of computer, internet, telephone etc. Children's Wing, Ladies Wing, Women's Home Library Scheme, Continuing Education Centre etc. are available here

References

Hindu temples in Kollam district
Bhagavathi temples in Kerala